This is a list of Dutch television related events from 1999.

Events
14 March - Marlayne is selected to represent Netherlands at the 1999 Eurovision Song Contest with her song "One Good Reason". She is selected to be the forty-first Dutch Eurovision entry during Nationaal Songfestival held at NOS Studios in Hilversum.
16 September - The television reality show Big Brother debuts on Veronica.
12 October - Erna Otte-Hemmink, performing as Emma Shapplin  wins the fifteenth series of Soundmixshow
30 December - The first series of Big Brother is won by Bart Spring in 't Veld.

Debuts
16 September - Big Brother (1999-2006)
1 November - De Club van Sinterklaas (1999-2009)

Television shows

1950s
NOS Journaal (1956–present)

1970s
Sesamstraat (1976–present)

1980s
Jeugdjournaal (1981–present)
Soundmixshow (1985-2002)
Het Klokhuis (1988–present)

1990s
Goede tijden, slechte tijden (1990–present)
Goudkust (1996-2001)
Monte Carlo (1998-2002)

Ending this year

Births

See also
1999 in the Netherlands

Deaths